In 2021, Niger has been affected by subsequent floods due to heavy rains, causing several deaths and widespread damage nationwide. Niamey is the most affected area. At least 62 people died, 60 were injured and 105,690 individuals have been affected by the floods. Most fatalities were reported in Maradi Region with 18 deaths.

Background 
Niger began to experience significant rains in midJune. Flooding was caused by heavy rainfall, which killed many people and destroyed thousands of homes across the country. Flooding was recorded in 413 communities spanning 77 communes in all regions of Niger, according to the Civil Protection. The floods killed at least 62 peoples and wounded 60 more. Some perished as a result of drowning in floodwaters, while others died as a result of falling structures. Flooding was also recorded in the DRC, Gambia, Chad, Nigeria, and Ghana. Floods have affected around 291,000 people in the Democratic Republic of the Congo. On August 19, flash floods slammed into Bukavu, the capital of South Kivu Province, killing one and leaving two people missing. Flooding has also impacted parts of neighboring North Kivu Province. Windstorms and flash floods have killed 12 persons and impacted 109,000 in Gambia. Flooding has affected 32,000 people in Nigeria's western, northern, and eastern regions, destroying hundreds of houses and crops and killing dozens.

History

2016 

In 2016, Floods claimed the lives of at least 38 persons. The desert areas of Tahoua in the west, Agadez in the north, and Maradi in the south were the hardest hit. The floods affected more than 92,000 individuals. More than 92,000 people were affected by the floods. The 2016 floods in Niger were caused by wetland degradation, climate change, and excessive upstream dam outflow. Due to the large number of Nigerian refugees, the international humanitarian aid in Niger was centered on the Diffa area. Doctors Without Borders and UNICEF, on the other hand, joined the local and federal government response to the floods, mainly in the most hit areas of Maradi, Tahoua, Agadez, and Zinder.

In October, the country was also affected by a cholera outbreak in two health districts in the Dosso area.

2017 
Major floods struck the country in June. The most hit areas were Tillabéri and Niamey. There were 14 recorded deaths. In the worst-affected areas, three people were killed in Tillabéri, while one person was killed in Niamey.

In mid-July, Heavy rain in the Tahoua region's departments of Tchintabaraden and Abalak caused serious floods, impacting over 20,000 people and inflicting catastrophic damage to crops in the area.

On August 26–27, continuous severe rains caused significant flooding, home devastation, and loss of personal possessions throughout Niger. In Niamey, two persons were killed. Since May, 38 people have perished as a result of the floods.

2018 
Flooding in Niger killed 45 lives and impacted an estimated 208,000 people in 2018. According to the National Crisis Task Force on Natural Disaster Floods, 17,389 dwellings and 7,836 hectares of agricultural land have been devastated, and over 30,000 animals have been lost.

In July, torrential rains on July 15 triggered floods throughout the country, resulting in the collapse of at least 100 homes. Similar torrential rains struck Nigeria's neighboring state of Katsina, killing at least 44 people, leaving 20 people missing, and damaging 500 houses in the city of Jibia.

On July 23, at least 13 people were confirmed dead, 13 were injured, and 17,682 people were impacted by flooding around the country. The areas of Agadez and Maradi have been impacted the worst. The floodwaters wrecked 649 homes, affected over 3,000 households, and killed 24,617 animals and devastated 400 hectares of cropland. A cholera outbreak was reported in Maradi the same day. According to the Ministry of Public Health, 247 cases of cholera, including four fatalities, have been reported in the department of Madarounfa in the southern Maradi area. The most impacted regions are Dan Issa, Gabi, Harounawa, Madeini, Maraka, Niger, and N'Yelwa. The cholera outbreak was declared on July 13 following sample analysis conducted in Niamey.

On August 13, The Ministry of Humanitarian Action reported approximately 50,000 homeless persons as a result of the damage or full loss of 3,131 houses. Since the first cholera case was found in the Madarounfa area of the Maradi region in early July, a total of 22 people have died, 26,344 livestock have been killed, and 3,900 hectares of land have been ravaged, and the number of individuals afflicted by cholera has risen. The Ministry of Public Health reported at least 1,107 cholera cases, including 19 fatalities. Sixty-six of the cases were from Maradi, a densely populated town.

On August 28, the Ministry of Humanitarian Affairs stated that 36 people were killed in the floods, and 130,000 people had their homes demolished, animals murdered, and land wrecked.

On September 30, the National Crisis Task Force on Natural Disaster Floods stated that 17,389 homes and 7,836 hectares of cultivated land had been destroyed, with over 30,000 animals killed. At least 45 people were killed, and 208,000 were injured.

2019 
In 2019, more than 211,000 people were affected and 57 were killed in the floods.

Flooding was caused by heavy rainfall since June, killing at least 57 people and affecting more than 211,000 people. There were a total of 16,375 homes destroyed. Three regions are accountable for 67% of the impacted population (Maradi, Zinder and Agadez). In August, the waters of the Niger basin reached flood stage, increasing the number of victims. Zinder, Maradi, and Agadez are the severely impacted areas. The United Nations reported that more than 16,000 houses have been damaged, displacing tens of thousands of people, and an estimated 123,000 children have been directly affected by the floods. Widespread flooding was also recorded in Nigeria, Mauritania, the Central African Republic, Algeria, and Morocco.

The Niger River reached a dangerous level in August. Since late August, the Niger river near Niamey has been high due to torrential rains in the Niger basin beginning on August 23. On August 27, the river surpassed the Orange Alert level (5.80 metres). The rise in water level has been extremely rapid since then, according to the Niger Basin Authority.

On September 4, it was 6.33 metres, significantly beyond the Red Alert limit of 6.2 metres and much above the average level of 5.5 metres. At the Banankoro (5.5 metres) and Koulikoro (4 metres) stations in Mali, the river is near to or above the Yellow Alert level.

2020 
In 2020, flooding caused by heavy rains claimed 73 lives and sparked a humanitarian crisis with 2.2 million people needing assistance.

On July 21, authorities reported that heavy rainfall since June had affected 20,174 people and left nine dead. The most affected regions are Maradi and Tahoua, in the west, with respectively 13,667 and 4,173 people affected. About 2,244 houses have collapsed and 713 ruminants died. Local authorities in Maradi have provided food and non-food items to over 2,000 most vulnerable people in Oli Mamane Doutchi village, Bermo commune.

On August 6, the Ministry of Humanitarian Affairs reported 14 people dead, 3,417 houses destroyed and 35,360 people have been affected, had their livestock killed, and their lands devastated.

Heavy rainfall, coupled with rising water levels in the major river basins, has led to severe flooding across the country with a large proportion of land still flooded and widespread damage to agricultural, livestock and fishing equipment as well as crops. Niger's western region has been badly hit after days of torrential rainfall caused the Niger river to burst its banks. The capital city of Niamey was brought to a standstill by the waters. The rainfall and water levels of the Niger river has surpassed previous records.

On August 29, at least 45 people died and 226,000 displaced.

On September 14, the death toll increased to 65. Severe floods caused by torrential rains in Niger have caused deaths and destruction of properties across the country, affecting 432,613 people, and leaving them in need of shelter, water, food and essential items. About 36,155 houses have collapsed and 8,989 hectares of farmland destroyed. The floods have caused the Niger River, dams and dykes to burst and huge volumes of water to engulf people's homes, farms and other buildings without warning.

Timeline

June 
In mid-June, heavy rainfall was experienced in the country, resulting in floods, causing widespread damage and casualties.

July 
On July 31, the national authorities in Niger reported 35 people dead as a result of flooding and heavy rains in the country since the start of the rainy season. At least 20 people died as a result of houses collapsing, while 15 people drowned in flood waters. Twenty-four people were injured. Fatalities were reported in the regions of Maradi, Agadez and the capital Niamey. Meanwhile, over 2,500 houses and shelters were destroyed, along with schools, mosques and places of work. Over 700 livestock also perished.

August 
On August 11, the Directorate of Civil Protection in Niger reported 52 fatalities and more than 50,000 people affected from 5,694 households. Floods and rainfall has damaged 4,137 houses with around 300 completely destroyed. The capital, Niamey, saw heavy rainfall from August 10–11. Five people died in Niamey. Flooding caused damage to roads, infrastructure and buildings. Some districts were left isolated. Around 17 houses collapsed in the Yantala district, where 3 people died, one was missing and 2 people seriously injured.

On August 12, the country's flooding death toll rose to 55 and left 53,000 others displaced. More than 4,800 homes have been damaged by floods or landslips, and nearly 900 cattle have been lost. The worst-hit regions are Maradi in the southeast, Agadez in the desert north and the capital Niamey, where 16 have died.

On August 14, the flood's death toll rose to 64. Thirty-two people had died when their buildings collapsed, and another 32 drowned in flood waters. The floods and landslides had affected close to 70,000 people in total, with more than 5,100 houses destroyed or damaged and 69,515 people affected. Six people died in Niamey.

On August 23, the death toll's number decreased to 62. Over 100,000 people were affected by the floods. Thousands of houses were destroyed. Along with the floods, a cholera outbreak is also affecting the country with at least 1,770 cases, including 68 deaths.

Causes 
Heavy rainfall is the main cause of the flooding in Niger since it was the country's rainy season. Rainy season in Niger starts from May until October, but most rains occur from June until August causing widespread flooding.

Wetland degradation is also a cause of the flooding since the ecology of the Niger River has been devastated by various land use changes. There is not enough vegetation to retain water, making floods more likely during the rainy season.

Global climate change, urbanization or increase in development are also one of the causes of flooding, as well as drainage failure, since the drainage systems are approaching capacity, and many towns even lack drainage networks and the dumping of garbage on the streets blocks surface runoff during heavy downpour events, blockage of flood channels, rivers overflowing, release of water from dams, and dikes bursting.

Impact 
On August 9, eight people were swept away by the flash floods that struck the city of Agadez. Several homes collapsed and were destroyed by the floods resulting in casualties. In Niamey, a total of 741 homes were destroyed and at least 16 deaths were reported. In Maradi, the most fatalities were reported, where 18 people died and a total of 3,243 homes were destroyed. Meanwhile, at least 2,354 homes were destroyed by the floods in the region of Zinder and a total of 1,040 homes were destroyed in Tahoua Region.

An outbreak of cholera was also reported in several regions of Niger in August, affecting more people living in the country. As of August 23, there were 1,770 cases and 68 deaths reported. Only the regions of Agadez and Diffa were unaffected.

See also 
List of deadliest floods
List of floods

References 

Floods in Niger
2021 disasters in Niger
2021 floods in Africa
June 2021 events in Africa
July 2021 events in Africa
August 2021 events in Africa